The Circle is a studio album by punk rock band Wipers, released on Restless in 1988.

Critical reception
Trouser Press wrote that "The Circle‘s scorching opener, 'I Want a Way', and its tumultuous title track are red herrings for Wipers’ business as usual." The Rough Guide to Rock wrote that "jazzy distorted riffing hadn't sounded this invigorating since Hendrix or Robert Fripp had their heyday."

Track listing
All songs written by Greg Sage.

 "I Want a Way" - 2:35
 "Time Marches On" - 2:50
 "All the Same" - 3:36
 "True Believer" - 3:54
 "Good Thing" - 2:28
 "Make or Break" - 3:40
 "The Circle" - 4:33
 "Goodbye Again" - 3:19
 "Be There" - 2:48
 "Blue & Red" - 3:06

Personnel
 Greg Sage – vocals, guitar, harp; producer
 Brad Davidson – bass guitar
 Steve Plouf – drums

References

1988 albums
Wipers albums